Oh Mary Be Careful is an extant 1921 American silent comedy film produced by Goldwyn Pictures and released by an independent distributor. Stage actress Madge Kennedy stars in the film, which was directed by Arthur Ashley. A copy is preserved at the Library of Congress.

The film was allegedly shot several years earlier during 1917 and released in 1921 after the rights were acquired by Pioneer Film.

Cast
Madge Kennedy as Mary Meacham
George J. Forth as Morgan Smith
George S. Stevens as Judge Adams
Bernard Thornton as Dick Lester
A. Drehle as Doctor Chase
Marguerite Marsh as Susie
Harry Fraser as Professor Putnam
Dixie Thompson as Luke
May Rogers as Nellie Burns (credited as Mae Rogers)
Kate Lester as Kathleen McEchran
Harry Myers as Bobby Burns
Marcia Harris as Myra Meacham

References

External links

1921 films
American silent feature films
Goldwyn Pictures films
Films based on short fiction
Silent American comedy films
1921 comedy films
Films set in Virginia
American black-and-white films
Surviving American silent films
1920s American films